Carlos Julio Martínez Rivas (born 4 February 1994), known as Carlos Julio in Spain, is a Dominican professional footballer who plays for the Dominican Republic national team. Mainly a right-back, he can also play as a midfielder.

Club career
Born in Santo Domingo Este, Carlos Julio emigrated to Barcelona in 2000 and was in FC Barcelona's La Masia academy until 2013, when he signed for Villarreal CF. He represented their third and reserve teams in Tercera División and Segunda División B respectively, before on 9 July 2016 signing a two-year deal with Marbella FC of the latter.

On 9 July 2018, Carlos Julio joined fellow third division side CD Mirandés. On 18 July of the following year, after achieving promotion to Segunda División, he renewed his contract for a further campaign.

On 14 August 2021, he joined Polish I liga side Miedź Legnica on a one-year deal. On 30 January 2023, he left the club after amicably terminating his contract.

International career
Carlos Julio also holds Spanish citizenship, and represented Dominican Republic at the 2012 Caribbean Cup.

Honours
Miedź Legnica
I liga: 2021–22

References

External links

1994 births
Living people
People from Santo Domingo Province
Dominican Republic footballers
Association football defenders
Association football midfielders
Segunda División B players
Tercera División players
Ekstraklasa players
I liga players
III liga players
Villarreal CF C players
Villarreal CF B players
Marbella FC players
CD Mirandés footballers
Miedź Legnica players
Dominican Republic international footballers
Dominican Republic emigrants to Spain
Naturalised citizens of Spain
Spanish footballers
Expatriate footballers in Poland